Gayan de Silva (born 5 January 1990) is a Sri Lankan cricketer. He made his first-class debut for Sri Lanka Navy Sports Club in Tier B of the 2019–20 Premier League Tournament on 14 February 2020. He made his List A debut for Sri Lanka Navy Sports Club in the 2019–20 Invitation Limited Over Tournament on 14 December 2019.

References

External links
Player profile and statistics at ESPNcricinfo

1990 births
Living people
Sri Lanka Air Force Sports Club cricketers
Sri Lankan cricketers